The 2017 Blancpain GT Series Endurance Cup was the seventh season of the Blancpain GT Series Endurance Cup. The season began on 23 April at Monza and ended on 1 October in Barcelona. The season featured five rounds, with each race lasting for a duration of three hours besides the 24 Hours of Spa and the 1000 km Paul Ricard events.

Calendar
At the annual press conference during the 2016 24 Hours of Spa on 29 July, the Stéphane Ratel Organisation announced the first draft of the 2017 calendar. The Sprint Cup round in Barcelona became an Endurance Cup round, replacing the round at the Nürburgring.

Entry list

Race results
Bold indicates overall winner.

Championship standings
Scoring system
Championship points were awarded for the first ten positions in each race. The pole-sitter also received one point and entries were required to complete 75% of the winning car's race distance in order to be classified and earn points. Individual drivers were required to participate for a minimum of 25 minutes in order to earn championship points in any race.

Race points

1000 km Paul Ricard points

24 Hours of Spa points
Points were awarded after six hours, after twelve hours and at the finish.

Drivers' championships

Overall

Pro-Am Cup

Am Cup

Teams' championships

Overall

Pro-Am Cup

Am Cup

See also
2017 Blancpain GT Series
2017 Blancpain GT Series Sprint Cup
2017 Blancpain GT Series Asia

Notes

References

External links

 Endurance Cup